Shahram Bozorgmehr (born 26 June 1983 in Tehran, Iran) is an Iranian singer, song writer, arranger, and model.

Biography 
Shahram Bozorgmehr, fourth child in a family of seven of Azerbaijani origin. He has a master's degree in chiropractic and is single. He has worked in the field of sport for many years. After that, due to his interest and background in music, he entered music classes and took his music and singing courses under the supervision of great masters such as the late Mohammad Nouri, and then in 2001 he entered the field of music. In addition to singing, he has performed songwriting and composition on his albums and he released
his first album in the year 2004 called Divare Shekasteh composed by Faraz Afshar and two other albums called Hamsedaye Ghalbam in 2006 with composers such as Hamed Hakan and the album Ahdi Dobareh
 in 2008 has in his record. He left Iran after the album Ahdi Dabareh and lived in Sweden for some time and for this reason, he did not play music in Iran from 2009 to 2013 and after a pause of 8 years, he released his latest album called Khastani (Desirable) in 2016. Among his artistic collaborators are famous composers and arrangers such as: Shahab Akbari, Pouria Heydari, Maziyar Attarian, Saeed Sam, Shahab Hoseyni and songwriters such as: Amir Arjeini, Ali Estiri, Behrouz Bayat, Pariya Soufipour and musicians such as: Firouz Veysanlou, Masoud Homayouni, Behnam Hakim, Payam Touni, Meysam Marvasti and Babak Yousefi Can be named. Shahram Bozorgmehr had a successful return to the Iranian music market with his album Khastani (Desirable) in 2016, and with the video teaser of his album Khastani (Desirable) in 2016, he was able to gain the praise of news agencies and music circles, so that his work was mentioned as the most prominent of music video.
After that, in 2017, Shahram Bozorgmehr released the religious song Eltemas, which received a good response, and Then in 2018, ten days before his birthday, he visited his fans in Göteborg, Sweden, and performed a concert at Heurlins.
Later, after three years of silence and rest and with a partial recovery from his illness, Shahram Bozorgmehr released his new song and music video called Nimkate Khali and resumed his activities.

Concerts 

After a partial recovery from his illness, Shahram Bozorgmehr also had overseas and international concerts, including a concert at Heurlins Plats in Göteborg, Sweden on June 15, 2018, and a concert at the Queen Elizabeth Theatre in Vancouver, Canada on March 14, 2020. A concert of wishes after many years at William Aston Hall, Glyndwr University, Wrexham, England, on September 26, 2020, as well as concerts at the City National Grove Of Anaheim, California, on February 24, 2021, a concert at the Microsoft Theater in Los Angeles, California, United States of America, on January 9, 2022  And also a concert at the Toronto Centre for the Arts in Toronto, Canada, on September 11, 2022 can be named, And Shahram Bozorgmehr's concert tour is supposed to continue if he recovers from his illness.

Modeling
 
Shahram Bozorgmehr also worked in modeling for two years in 2011, but due to busy work, heart disease, and taking medical drugs, he left his ideal style and stopped working in this field.
In August 2018, by improving his heart and physical condition under the supervision of a number of medical specialists and some bodybuilding and Physical fitness, he obtained his ideal body shape and in cooperation with Mirwana Modeling Company by concluding contracts with several reputable brands, he resumed his modeling activity and returned to the world of modeling.

Discography

Albums 

 Khastani ( Desirable ) (12 August 2016)

 Ahdi Dobareh (29 January 2008)

 Hamsedaye Ghalbam (6 August 2006)

 Divare Shekasteh (26 November 2004)

Singles

References

External links

 
 Shahram Bozorgmehr on Instagram
 Shahram Bozorgmehr on Spotify
 Shahram Bozorgmehr on Tidal

1983 births
Living people
Iranian singer-songwriters
Iranian pop singers
21st-century Iranian male singers
Persian-language singers
Singers from Tehran
Iranian male singers
Iranian male models